Huszar or Huszár as a surname can refer to:

Károly Huszár (1882-1941), Hungarian Prime Minister
Vilmos Huszár (1884-1960), Hungarian painter, designer and De Stijl group member
Alternative spelling for Hussar